Ada Nield Chew (28 January 1870 – 27 December 1945) was a campaigning socialist and a British suffragist. Her name is on the plinth of Millicent Fawcett's statue in Parliament Square, London.

Life 
Nield was born on a White Hall Farm, Talke o’ the Hill, near Butt Lane in North Staffordshire on 28 January 1870, daughter of Willam and Jane (née Hammond) Nield. She  was one of 13 children. She left school at the age of eleven to help her mother take care of house and family. 

When she was in her twenties she worked as a tailor in a factory in Crewe, Cheshire, but was dismissed after writing a series of letters to the Crewe Chronicle in 1894 under the pseudonym “A Crewe Factory Girl” which criticised working conditions for women and girls in the factory. She highlighted issues such as the unfairness by which work was allocated and the practice of charging workers for their tea breaks and the materials they required to do their work. The factory employed 400 women and 100 men but paid the women a fraction of the men's wages for their roles in making uniforms for soldiers, police and railway workers. She argued for a living wage for women rather than a “lingering, dying wage”.

Her letters had attracted the attention of the Independent Labour Party (ILP), who offered her employment if her identity as the Crewe Factory Girl was discovered. When her identity was uncovered, she became active in the ILP. By the end of the year she has been elected as a Nantwich Poor Law Guardian (one of the very first working-class female Guardians) and was working with the local Trades Council. In 1896, she toured the north-east of England in the Clarion Van organised by Julia Dawson to publicise the ILP's policies. 

Shortly afterwards, in 1897 she married George Chew, another ILP organiser. Their daughter (and only child), Doris, was born in the following year. Chew then became an organiser for the Women's Trade Union League in 1900, working alongside Mary Macarthur.

In the years leading up to the First World War, Chew became an active supporter of the movement for women's suffrage. According to her daughter, Chew as a working class woman, sometimes felt patronised by the middle class leadership of the movement. This was reflected in a lively correspondence with Christabel Pankhurst in the pages of The Clarion during 1904. In the provinces she with Selina Cooper and Margaret Aldersley were experienced labour activists in Lancashire. Chew became a member of the National Union of Women's Suffrage Societies and worked for this body as an organiser from 1911 to 1914. The main focus of her work was in winning support for the cause through contacts in the labour movement.

During the First World War Chew adopted a pacifist stance and was active in the Women's International League for Peace and Freedom and other anti-war organisations.

After the end of the war, and the achievement of women’s suffrage in 1918, Chew withdrew from any major involvement in politics, but still worked to improve the working conditions, diet and health of working class women. She focused on building up Chew & Co. the mail-order drapery business which she founded, with premises in Chapel Street, Salford. She also ran a health food store, which developed out of her vegetarianism. She retired from the business in 1930 and undertook a round-the-world tour in 1935. 

Her husband died in 1940, and Chew died on 27 December 1945 at, Burnley, Lancashire. She was cremated and her ashes scattered on the Rose Lawn at Rochdale Cemetery. She was survived by her daughter, Doris, who later edited a selection of her writings together with a brief biography.

Archives
An oral history interview between Brian Harrison and Doris Nield Chew, about her mother, Ada, is held at The Women's Library. It is one of over 200 interviews made in the 1970s as part of 'Oral Evidence on the Suffragette and Suffragist Movements: the Brian Harrison interviews'.

Posthumous recognition
Her name and picture (and those of 58 other women's suffrage supporters) are on the plinth of the statue of Millicent Fawcett in Parliament Square, London, unveiled in 2018.

See also 
 History of feminism
 List of suffragists and suffragettes
 National Union of Women's Suffrage Societies
 Women's suffrage in the United Kingdom
 List of peace activists

References

 Liddington, J.  "Rediscovering Suffrage History", History Workshop Journal, 4 (1977), pp. 192–201.

1870 births
1945 deaths
People from Butt Lane
British suffragists
British feminists
British pacifists
British socialists
British socialist feminists
Pacifist feminists
Women's International League for Peace and Freedom people